An Sun-Jin (born September 19, 1975) is a former South Korean football player.

Club statistics

References

External links

1975 births
Living people
South Korean footballers
South Korean expatriate footballers
Mito HollyHock players
Pohang Steelers players
J2 League players
K League 1 players
South Korean expatriate sportspeople in Japan
Expatriate footballers in Japan
Korea University alumni
Association football midfielders